The 2003 Saskatchewan Roughriders finished in 3rd place in the West Division with an 11–7 record. They defeated the Winnipeg Blue Bombers in the West Semi-Final, but lost the West Final to the Edmonton Eskimos.

Offseason

CFL draft

Preseason

Regular season

Season standings

Season schedule

Roster

Awards and records
CFL's Most Outstanding Offensive Lineman Award – Andrew Greene

CFL All-Star Selections
Andrew Greene, Offensive Guard
Reggie Hunt, Linebacker
Jackie Mitchell, Linebacker
Omarr Morgan, Corner Back

Western All-Star Selections
Nate Davis, Defensive Tackle
Andrew Greene, Offensive Guard
Reggie Hunt, Linebacker
Paul McCallum, Placekicker
Jackie Mitchell, Linebacker
Omarr Morgan, Corner Back
Jeremy O'Day, Centre

Milestones

Playoffs

West Semi-Final

West Final

References

Saskatchewan Roughriders
Saskatchewan Roughriders seasons
Saskatchewan Roughriders Season, 2003